Hon. Sir Galbraith Lowry Cole,  (1 May 1772 – 4 October 1842) was an Anglo-Irish British Army general and politician.

Early life
Cole was the second son of an Irish peer, William Willoughby Cole, 1st Earl of Enniskillen (1 March 1736–22 May 1803), and Anne Lowry-Corry (d. September 1802), the daughter of Galbraith Lowry-Corry of Tyrone, and the sister of Armar Lowry-Corry, 1st Earl Belmore.

Army service
Cole was commissioned a cornet in 12th Dragoon Guards in 1787,. He transferred to 5th Dragoon Guards as a lieutenant in 1791 and to 70th Foot as a captain in 1792, and served in the West Indies, Ireland, and Egypt. He was appointed lieutenant colonel in Ward’s late regiment of foot in 1794 and lieutenant colonel in the late General Villette's corps in 1799, on Full Pay although these units had been disbanded. He was promoted to colonel in the Army in 1801 and served as brigadier general in Sicily and commanded the 1st Brigade at the Battle of Maida on 4 July 1806. In 1808 he was promoted to major-general. In 1809 he was appointed to the staff of the army serving in Spain and Portugal and granted the local rank of lieutenant-general in 1811. This rank was confirmed in the Army in 1813. He commanded the 4th Division in the Peninsular War under Wellington, and was wounded at the Battle of Albuera in which he played a decisive part. He was also wounded, much more seriously, at Salamanca. He was promoted to full general in 1830.

For having served with distinction in the battles of Maida, Albuera, Salamanca, Vittoria, Pyrenees, Nivelle, Orthez and Toulouse, he received the Army Gold Cross with four clasps. In 1815 he became General Officer Commanding Northern District.

He was appointed Colonel of the 103rd Foot in 1812, 70th Foot in 1814 and 34th Foot in 1816. He subsequently became Governor of Gravesend and Tilbury fort. He was also colonel of the 27th Foot

Member of Parliament
He was Member of Parliament in the Irish House of Commons for the family seat of Enniskillen from 1797 to 1800, and represented Fermanagh in the British House of Commons in 1803.

He was appointed 2nd Governor of Mauritius from 12 June 1823 to 17 June 1828. He left in 1828 to take up the post of Governor of the Cape Colony which position he filled until 1833.

Cole was knighted in 1813, and was invested as a Knight Grand Cross, Order of the Bath on 2 January 1815.

He is commemorated in Enniskillen by a statue surmounting a  column in Fort Hill Park, carried out by the Irish sculptor, Terence Farrell.

Family

Cole was married on 15 June 1815 to Frances Harris (d. 1 November 1847), daughter of James Harris, 1st Earl of Malmesbury, for whom Malmesbury, Western Cape is named, and Harriet Mary, his wife. His late marriage was attributed by his family to the unhappy outcome of his romance with the future Duchess of Wellington, to whom he had been briefly engaged in 1802-3. Frances Cole played a prominent part in social philanthropy in the Cape and worked towards having Coloured children taught useful trades. Colesberg, a town in the Cape, is named after him, as is Sir Lowry's Pass near Cape Town. They had seven children:

 Arthur Lowry Cole, Col. 17th Regiment, C.B., Knight of the Medjidie (b. 24 August 1817 – d. 30 March 1885)
 William Willoughby Cole, Capt. 27th Regiment (b. 17 November 1819 – d. 4 April 1863)
 James Henry Cole (b. 15 December 1821)
 Florence Mary Georgiana Cole (b. 4 June 1816)
 Louisa Catherine Cole (b. 16 August 1818 – d. 14 October 1878, aged 60)
 Frances Maria Frederica Cole (b. 9 April 1824)
 Henrietta Anne Paulina Cole (b. 6 October 1826)

His elder brother John Willoughby Cole (23 March 1768–31 March 1840) married Charlotte Paget (d. 26 January 1817), the daughter of Henry Bayly Paget, 1st Earl of Uxbridge.

His sisters were:
 Sarah Cole (d. 14 March 1833), married (1790) Owen Wynne
 Elizabeth Anne Cole (d. 1807), married (1788) Colonel Richard Magenis (d. 6 March 1831)
 Florence Cole (d. 1 March 1862), married (1797) Blayney Townley Balfour of Townley Hall, Drogheda, Co. Louth (d. 22 December 1856)
 Henrietta Frances Cole (22 June 1784–2 July 1848), married (20 July 1805) Thomas Philip Robinson, 2nd Earl de Grey (8 December 1781–14 November 1859)

He lived at Highfield House, Heckfield in Hampshire, adjacent to the Stratfield Saye estate of his friend the Duke of Wellington.

References

Sources

External links
Enniskillen at nidirect.gov.uk
Genealogy

|-

 

|-

|-

|-

1772 births
1842 deaths
People from Hart District
19th-century Irish people
19th-century Anglo-Irish people
Irish soldiers in the British Army
27th Regiment of Foot officers
British Army generals
British Army commanders of the Napoleonic Wars
British Army personnel of the Peninsular War
Cole family (Anglo-Irish aristocracy)
Governors of British Mauritius
Governors of the Cape Colony
Irish MPs 1798–1800
Knights Grand Cross of the Order of the Bath
Members of the Parliament of Ireland (pre-1801) for County Fermanagh constituencies
Members of the Parliament of the United Kingdom for County Fermanagh constituencies (1801–1922)
Military personnel from Dublin (city)
Politicians from Dublin (city)
Younger sons of earls
Recipients of the Army Gold Cross
UK MPs 1802–1806
UK MPs 1806–1807
UK MPs 1807–1812
UK MPs 1812–1818
UK MPs 1818–1820
UK MPs 1820–1826